Latvian names in space include:

Mars
 Auce crater
 Talsi crater

Asteroids
 1796 Riga
 1284 Latvia
 1805 Dirikis
 2867 Šteins
 3233 Krišbarons

External links
 https://profizgl.lu.lv/mod/book/view.php?id=19056&chapterid=4903

Space program of Latvia
Astronomical nomenclature by nation